State Route 226 (SR 226) is a northeast–southwest state highway in the central part of the U.S. state of Ohio.

Route description
State Route 226 travels through the northwestern portion of Holmes County and the southwestern quadrant of Wayne County.  There is no segment of State Route 226 that is incorporated within the National Highway System.

History
State Route 226 was established in 1929.  It was routed along the alignment that it maintains to this day, replacing what was designated as State Route 250.  This was due to the designation of U.S. Route 250 in the state of Ohio in that same year.  No changes of major significance have taken place to State Route 226 since its inception.

Major intersections

References

226
Transportation in Holmes County, Ohio
Transportation in Wayne County, Ohio